The 2021–22 Delaware Fightin' Blue Hens men's basketball team represented the University of Delaware in the 2021–22 NCAA Division I men's basketball season. The Fightin' Blue Hens, led by sixth-year head coach Martin Ingelsby, played their home games at the Bob Carpenter Center in Newark, Delaware as members of the Colonial Athletic Association. They finished the season 22–13, 10–8 in CAA Play to finish a tie for fourth place. As the No. 5 seed, they defeated Drexel, Towson, and UNC Wilmington to win the CAA tournament. They received the conference’s automatic bid to the NCAA tournament as the No. 15 seed in the South Region, where they lost in the first round to Villanova.

Previous season
The Fightin' Blue Hens finished the 2020–21 season 7–8, 5–4 in CAA play to finish in fifth place. They lost to Hofstra in the quarterfinals of the CAA tournament.

Roster

Schedule and results 

|-
!colspan=12 style=| Non-conference regular season

|-
!colspan=9 style=| CAA regular season

|-
!colspan=12 style=| CAA tournament

|-
!colspan=12 style=| NCAA tournament

|-

Source

References

Delaware Fightin' Blue Hens men's basketball seasons
Delaware Fightin' Blue Hens
Delaware Fightin' Blue Hens men's basketball
Delaware Fightin' Blue Hens men's basketball
Delaware